Yokosuka Municipal Yokosuka Sogo High School (横須賀総合高等学校 Yokosuka Senritsu Yokosuka Sōgō Kōtōgakkō) is a secondary school located in Yokosuka, Kanagawa Prefecture, Japan.

Yokosuka Sogo, which opened on April 1, 2003, is the only high school operated by the Yokosuka Education System, a municipally controlled school district serving Yokosuka residents.

As of 2016, the principal of Yokosuka Sogo is Yoshiyuki Yamagishi.

External links
 English page
 Japanese page

High schools in Kanagawa Prefecture
Educational institutions established in 2003
Buildings and structures in Yokosuka, Kanagawa
2003 establishments in Japan